New Delhi railway station (station code: NDLS) is the main railway station in Delhi. Platform 1 is located at Paharganj and platform 16 opens up on to the side of Ajmeri Gate. It is one of the busiest railway stations in the country in terms of train frequency and passenger movement.

Until the 1950s, the Old Delhi railway station was the main station in Delhi. The official inauguration of the one platform New Delhi railway station took place in 1956. The station building at Paharganj was the first in India to have common station facilities for all classes of passengers including a common entry and exit. With the station meeting its saturation limit as early as the 1970s, there have been continuous efforts over the decades to decongest the station including the rail traffic. By the 1980s the station had seven platforms, in 1995 it had ten platforms and during the 2010 redevelopment the platforms increased to sixteen. The new station building on the side of the Ajmeri Gate was upgraded during this redevelopment. Delhi Metro connectivity has been integrated.

The 16 platforms cater to around 235 trains which start, end, or pass through the station daily. According to different studies and periods of the year estimates for daily footfall and passengers handled varies. The average daily passenger inflow and outflow is about 2.13 lakh; other estimates place daily footfall at around 5 lakh, which can reach 6 lakh during peak festival season. Since 1999, the station holds the record for the largest route relay interlocking system in the world. As per the categorization of Indian Railway stations by commercial importance the station was formerly ranked A1 and is now an NSG-1 (Non-Suburban Grade-1) station.

History

Before the new imperial capital New Delhi was established after 1911, the Old Delhi railway station served the entire city and the Agra–Delhi railway line cut through what is today called Lutyens' Delhi. The line ran through plans for a new capital, including space set aside for the All India War Memorial and Kingsway.

The railway line was shifted along Yamuna river and opened in 1924. Minto rail bridge came up at this time. The East Indian Railway Company sanctioned the construction of a single story building and a single platform between Ajmeri Gate and Paharganj in 1926; this would go on to become the New Delhi railway station. The government's plans to have the new station built inside the Central Park of Connaught Place was rejected. The Viceroy entered the city through the new railway station during the inauguration of New Delhi in 1931. New structures were added to the railway station later and the original building served as the parcel office for many years.

A common entrance, exit and circulating area for all classes of passengers was created. It was the first station in India to have common facilities. Up until then an adapted form of the colonial era system had remained in place, the platform and area that had been reserved for the Britishers was used by upper class Indians while the other platforms and areas went to the lower classes. A common area for refreshments was built,  waiting areas as per ticket class, and resting rooms with different fees open to all classes. The building layout and design was done under the Architect of the Ministry of Railways. The one platform station was officially inaugurated on 16 April 1956. Up until then Old Delhi railway station was the main station.

The building exterior at this time was made of exposed concrete. In preparation for the 1982 Asian Games, the exterior of the main entrance on Paharganj side was covered with sandstone. This was then painted in the 1990s. Before the 2010 Commonwealth Games the original exterior was covered with aluminum. Pillars and benches were also given a metal look. Subsequently the exterior aluminum panels were given a colour combination.

In September 2009, the new building of the station on the Ajmeri Gate side was opened. The building has a total floor area of 9,000 m2 spread over three floors. The entrance and departure on this side were moved to different floors. A new route relay interlocking system was put into place; since 1999 this system remains the largest in the world according to Guinness World Records. The number of platforms was increased from 12 to 16 during this period. In the 1980s, the station had seven platforms. In 1995 the tenth platform was constructed. The Paharganj side faced more space constraints as compared to the Ajmeri Gate side.

In 2007, architecture firm Farrells (along with others such as Arup and SMEC) were commissioned as consultants with regard to the redevelopment, modernisation and expansion of the station in time for the 2010 Commonwealth Games in Delhi. The consultants would also be involved in the masterplan of the Indian Railways for the station redevelopment. Other consultants included AREP, Gerkan, Marg and Partners, HOK group and Rail India Technical and Economic Service (Rites). In 2008, a set of diagrams emerged; one set consisted of a glass and steel domed exterior encasing the entire platform area of the station, extensive changes would be made to ensure optimal utilization of footfall and vehicle space, and commercialization was integrated. The station occupies  and 10–20% of it (50 acres) could be used for retail and commercial use. 13 consortiums from around the world showed interest. In March 2020, long-term plans for a public private partnership (PPP) to change the railway station to improve passenger flow was described, with the Rail Land Development Authority put in charge. The plans and timing are not firm, only the goal, to make a world-class railway station.

There are around 8 temples and 5 mosques located in the vicinity of the station. There is a temple (Lankeshwar Mahadev temple) on platform 6-7 and a mosque (Masjid Ghareeb Shah) on platform 2-3. There was an unsuccessful attempt to demolish the temple in 1982. Ajmeri Gate and Ghaziuddin's Mosque are also located in the vicinity of the station. These structures come into question during redevelopment plans. The AMASR Act regulates construction in the vicinity of centrally protected monuments.

Rail traffic 

The station is the main junction for the Rajdhani Express and a number of pairs of Shatabdi Express originate and terminate at this station. In 1969 the first Rajdhani Express left from the station to Howrah. The first Vande Bharat Express was flagged off from the station in 2019. Luxury tourist trains have itinerary's which start and end at New Delhi railway station, Palace on Wheels, Royal Rajasthan on Wheels and Maharajas' Express. The Buddhist circuit train Mahaparinirvan Express also starts and end at the station. The number of trains per platform per day varies from 13 trains to 23 trains.  On average the station handles 237 trains every day, while the maximum handled in a day reaches 275. It handles around 350 unique trains in total. 

The station handled the introduction of passenger trains to cater to the increasing population growth and industrialization such as on the New Delhi-Ahmedabad route. Double heading trains ran from the station including the KK Express on the New Delhi-Bangalore-Trivandrum route. In 1967 on the New Delhi-Mumbai route a container service was started and on the New Delhi-Gwalior route folding containers were used. In the 1980s the station handled around 100 trains daily, including coaching, mail and express trains.

New Delhi railway station has seen numerous initiatives over the decades to decongest it. In the 1970-80s goods trains previously arriving at the station were diverted to other stations. New platforms including island platforms and platform faces were undertaken. Washing and stabling points, and shunting necks were increased. The Thomson Road side of the station also began to be developed with a station building, ticket facilities and other ancillary structures. Hazrat Nizamuddin railway station began to be considered with regard to easing the load of New Delhi railway station. In the 2000s decongestion efforts includes construction of new passenger terminals such as those at Anand Vihar Terminal railway station, diversion of trains to other stations such as Hazrat Nizamuddin railway station and additional stoppage of trains at other stations such as Delhi Shahdara Junction railway station. With the five main railway terminals in New Delhi, including New Delhi railway station, reaching a saturation limit other stations such as Bijwasan railway station are being developed.

Lines 
Rail lines include the New Delhi-Mumbai main line, Howrah-Gaya-Delhi line, both part of the Diamond Quadrilateral, and the New Delhi-Chennai main line; the lines have been improved in various ways over the years and there are plans to further improve it. The Delhi-Ahmedabad high-speed rail corridor, part of a larger modernisation push, is planned.

Suburban 

Suburban rail services such as the Delhi Ring Railway and the Delhi Suburban Railway were expanded for the 1982 Asian Games; New Delhi railway station is a stop. In 2010 as many as 78 suburban trains passed through the station daily. The main radials from New Delhi are towards Faridabad-Palwal, Sonipat-Panipat, Rohtak, Gurgaon-Rewari and Shahdara-Shamli. The other sub-sections/ring within National Capital Region (NCR) is New Delhi – Anand Vihar – New Delhi/Delhi.

Daily footfall and passengers 
The station handled around 268,000 passengers daily in 2011. Rohit Anand's study between 2016 and 2018 estimated a daily footfall of 482,000. In 2022, Rahul Bhatnagar's study placed the daily average passenger (inflow and outflow) as 213,000; the study calculated an equivalent passenger unit (EPU) of 4,15,157. During festivals, daily footfall can reach 6 lakh. Other estimates place daily footfall at around 5 lakh.

According to a 2009 study, in the capital region, the daily passengers originating at major stations is about 7.2 lakhs. With respect to suburban rail services the daily unreserved passengers per day for New Delhi railway station is around 38,000; this is out of a total of 4.3 lakh per day unreserved passengers.

Facilities and ancillary 
New Delhi's first round-the-clock service food court with national and international brands was opened up at the station in 2021. Facilities include a souvenir shop, book and magazine stalls, two executive lounges, waiting rooms, at least one escalator per platform, water vending machines, snack areas, and energy saving lighting systems. In 2014 Wi-Fi connectivity was launched at the station on a free basis for a limited period of time after which users would be required to pay for the service. The station is home to base kitchens. As of 2021, the cargo facility is being redeveloped.

According to the old categorization of Indian Railway stations by commercial importance, New Delhi was ranked A1; as per the new categorization system adopted in 2017 it is an NSG-1 station. Other ancillaries in the station complex include the Rail Yatri Niwas on the Ajmeri Gate side. In 1996 it provided single and double rooms at Rs 150/250, air-conditioned rooms for Rs 210/500, all with common bath, while dormitories provided cheaper facilities. A Delhi train ticket was required to access the hotel. The Rail Yatri Niwas has been run by Ginger Hotel in coordination with IRCTC since 2009. Security personnel, including the Railway Protection Force, Government Railway Police and Delhi Police, are present at the station. The station has over 150 CCTV cameras monitored by the railway police and assisted by the Signal and Telecommunication department of the Indian Railways. The station has two police stations and three posts.In cleanliness, the station ranked 165th out of 720 stations in India in an independent audit in 2019; out of 21 NSG-1 stations it ranked 11th. In 2016, out of 75 stations of the A1 category, New Delhi railway station ranked 55 in cleanliness. As part of a public-private partnership non-governmental organizations Chintan and Safai Sena support the material recovery facility at the station since 2012. Originally a garbage dump, an area has been redeveloped to facilitate waste segregation. Waste from passenger trains at the station is collected; this waste can reach 3-4 tonnes every day with a couple thousand plastic water bottles being collected. This experiment of the Indian railways to coordinate station cleanliness with the two NGOs resulted in friction with the traditional waste picker community. Mechanised cleaning is undertaken through different contractors. In 2017 energy saving systems were implemented into the lighting and fan fixtures. In 2016-2017, 2 MW rooftop solar panels were installed at the station by Vivaan Solar under public–private partnership and executed on design, build, finance, operate and transfer (DBFOT) basis; the company will also be responsible for maintaining the plant for a period of 25 years.

A beautification effort in 2018-19 resulted in a number of walls and staircases being covered with artwork and murals. The art includes numerous themes, graffiti, and styles from across India such as Warli tribal painting. The main façade on Ajmeri Gate side was covered with artwork of monuments and heritage in India. Green spaces have been developed.

Connectivity 

New Delhi railway station is served by New Delhi station on the Yellow Line of the Delhi Metro, and also by the Airport Express (Orange Line), which connects it directly to Indira Gandhi International Airport and further to the Blue Line. A  skywalk connects the foot over bridges on Ajmeri Gate side of the station to the metro and the parking complex on Bhavbhuti Marg.

Vehicle traffic congestion is an issue at the station that has been addressed in various ways over the years. In the 1970-80s consideration began for creating additional entry from Thompson Road and the widening of Chelmsford road. The 2016 report of the high powered committee on decongesting traffic in Delhi recommended the areas around the station as in need of decongestion. As of 2022 a new traffic circulation plan has been proposed.

State Entry Road, a colonial-era legacy situated on Paharganj side, bypasses the congested Chelmsford Road however access is limited.

References 

Works cited

Further reading 
Academic
 
 

News articles

External links 

 

Delhi railway division
Railway stations in Central Delhi district
Railway junction stations in India
Railway stations opened in 1926
1926 establishments in India
Indian Railway A1 Category Stations